Anil or Anıl may refer to:

People
 Anil (given name), an Indian given name (including a list of persons with the name)
 Anıl (given name), a Turkish given name (including a list of persons with the name)
 Anil (director), active in the Malayalam film industry since 1989

Other uses
 Anil, Rio de Janeiro, Brazil, a neighborhood
 Anıl, Hani, Turkey
 Anil (plant) (Indigofera suffruticosa), a species of flowering plant in the legume family
 Anil (chemistry), a type of imine
 Anila or Anil, a Vedic and Hindu deity

See also
 Añil 
 Anila (disambiguation)
 Anneal (disambiguation)